Kenshi may refer to:
 A practitioner of kendo
 Kenshi (video game), a 2018 role-playing video game
 Kenshi (Mortal Kombat), a character from the Mortal Kombat video game series
 Kenshi (given name), a Japanese given name